Javid Iqbal Aslam (born 26 January 1963) is a Norwegian boxer of Pakistani origin. He was born in Faisalabad in Punjab, Pakistan. He competed at the 1984 Summer Olympics in Los Angeles.

References

External links

1963 births
Living people
Sportspeople from Faisalabad
Olympic boxers of Norway
Boxers at the 1984 Summer Olympics
Pakistani emigrants to Norway
Norwegian male boxers
Light-welterweight boxers